Russell is an unincorporated community in Costilla County, in the U.S. state of Colorado.

History
A post office called Russell was in operation between 1876 and 1956. The community was named after William Greeneberry Russell, a prospector.

References

Unincorporated communities in Costilla County, Colorado
Unincorporated communities in Colorado